HLA-DR11 (DR11) is a HLA-DR serotype that recognizes the DRB1*1101 to *1110. DR11 serotype is a split antigen of the older HLA-DR5 serotype group which also contains the similar HLA-DR12 antigens.

Serology

The table above describes the efficiency of serological typing of DR11 and DR5.  Serotypes are unknown the following alleles: DRB1*1110 to *1157

Disease associations

By serotype
DR11 is associated with grape anaphylaxis, well-differentiated thyroid cancer, low antibody production in Hepatitis C.

By allele(s)
DRB1*11 is associated systemic sclerosis (SSc) & anti-DNA topoisomerase I (anti-topo I) antibody 

DRB1*1101 is associated Anti-Ro/SSA with anti-La/SSB antibodies in neonatal lupus erythematosus, mite sensitive asthma, cervical cancer risk (HPV?)

DRB1*1102: Tiopronin intolerance in rheumatoid arthritis

DRB1*1104: pauciarticular juvenile rheumatoid arthritis

By haplotype
DR11 is an identifier for the DR11-DQ7/DR7-DQ2 transhaplotype isoform of celiac disease.
DR11-DQ7.5 is identified as a risk factor in rheumatic heart disease.

DRB1*1101:DQA1*0505:DQB1*0301 haplotype is associated with Anti-Ro/SSA with anti-La/SSB antibodies in neonatal lupus erythematosus, mite sensitive asthma

DRB1*1102:DQA1*0505:DQB1*0301 haplotype is associated with hepatitis B virus persistence

Genetic Linkage

HLA-DR11 is genetically linked to HLA-DR52 and HLA-DQ7(3) serotypes.
The frequency node for DR11 is in the Levant and Anatolia. This serotype more than others appears to have spread with neolithization of Western Europe. The closely linked DQ7.5 appears to be protective against juvenile diabetes, in which wheat consumption appears to be a risk factor.

References

5